Ferraro is an occupational surname of Italian origin meaning blacksmith in Italian (from "ferro", the Italian word for iron). Notable people with this surname include:

 Chris Ferraro (born 1973), NHL hockey player, brother of Peter Ferraro
 Emanuele Ferraro (born 1978), Italian footballer
 Geraldine Ferraro (1935–2011), U.S. politician and 1984 Vice-President candidate
 Gustavo Ferraro, Argentinian banker
 James Ferraro, American experimental musician
 John Ferraro (1924–2001), Los Angeles city council man
 Joshua Ferraro, American entrepreneur and computer scientist
 Margaret Hart Ferraro also known as Margie Hart (1913–2000), striptease dancer and wife of John Ferraro
 Mario Ferraro (born 1998), Canadian ice hockey player
 Mike Ferraro (born 1944), former major league baseball player
 Nathan Ferraro, Canadian musician with rock band The Midway State
 Nicholas Ferraro (1928–1984), New York politician and judge
 Peter Ferraro (born 1973), NHL hockey player, brother of Chris Ferraro
 Pier Miranda Ferraro (1924–2008), Italian operatic tenor
 Ralph Ferraro (1929–2012), American film composer, orchestrator and arranger
 Ray Ferraro (born 1964), hockey player
 Rick Ferraro (born 1950), Canadian former politician in Ontario
 Salvatore Ferraro (born 1983), Italian football player
 Vince Ferraro, Fortune 100 business and marketing executive
 Nicholas Ferraro (Born 1993), American musician in Seattle

See also 
 
 Ferrara
 Ferrera
 Ferrero
 Ferrari (surname), the plural form

References 

Italian-language surnames